The following highways are numbered 579:

Canada
 Alberta Highway 579
 Manitoba Provincial Road 579
 Ontario Highway 579

United States